Racket Ridge is a ghost town in Van Buren County, Arkansas, United States.

References

Geography of Van Buren County, Arkansas
Ghost towns in Arkansas